This is a list of Monuments of National Importance (ASI) as officially recognized by and available through the website of the Archaeological Survey of India in the Indian state Tamil Nadu. 403 Monuments of National Importance have been recognized by the ASI in Chennai circle of Tamil Nadu. Due to the high amount of ASI-recognized monuments in the Chennai circle the monuments in the districts Kanchipuram and Pudukkottai are put in a separate list:

 Kanchipuram district
 Pudukkottai district

List of monuments in the Chennai circle 

|}

See also 
 List of Monuments of National Importance in Thrissur circle
 List of Monuments of National Importance in India for other Monuments of National Importance in India
 List of State Protected Monuments in Tamil Nadu

References 

Chennai circle